Ronin was a rock band based in Singapore. They were known for their live performances and being one of the few popular bands in the hard/classic rock genre from Singapore. Before their entry to the mainstream market, the band launched a self-released EP which included five songs, and later released an LP which was hugely successful. Their debut album Do or Die received rave reviews by local press, and is one of the top selling English-language albums in Singapore of all time. In 2006, the band collaborated with local Mediacorp artiste Fiona Xie in a love song duet, entitled "Love Will Shine on Through". The song was recorded to raise funds for a cancer project, with a book and a CD recorded together. One of their songs, "One More Moment", was covered by Singaporean artiste Ho Yeow Sun.

The band enjoyed a number one hit on local radio station 98.7, Black Maria in the Singapore charts, the song Crazy Son reached third. Ronin has also written the theme song and title soundtrack 'Memories' for the film Singapore Dreaming.

In June 2007, lead singer Levan Wee performed with the band for the last time, due to a combination of personal issues, as well as differences in musical direction. The band continued for a short while after, but has been inactive as of 2008.

Members 

 Sean Cheng: guitar
 Simon Lee: guitar
 Derryn Wong: bass
 Bang Ong: drums

All four members of Ronin were students from Victoria School. The band members have cameo appearances in the movie Anna & Anna, starring Karena Lam. They appear as the backing band of the film's lead actor, Tender Huang.

Previous members
 Levan Wee: vocals (left in 2007)

Discography 

 The EP – a five-song EP which was self-released in January 2004. It was recorded at Snakeweed Studios, produced by Leonard Soosay and Ronin, and mastered at 301 Studios in Sydney.
 Do or Die – a full-length album released in August 2005 and distributed by Universal Music. Recorded at Snakeweed Studios and produced by Leonard Soosay and Ronin.

References

External links 
garageband.com – Ronin profile

Singaporean rock music groups
Victoria School, Singapore alumni